Alyaksandr Hrapkowski (born 12 March 1975) is a Belarusian professional football coach and former player.

He represented Belarus in international competition, playing for the national team between 2002 and 2004 and appearing in UEFA Euro 2004 qualification.

Career
As a youth player, Hrapowski played for Dynamo SDYUSHOR-3.

After leaving Dinamo Minsk, Hrapowski played for Sokol Saratov.

Honours
Dinamo Minsk
Belarusian Premier League champion: 1997

References

External links
 
 

1975 births
Living people
Footballers from Minsk
Belarusian footballers
Belarus under-21 international footballers
Belarus international footballers
Russian Premier League players
FC Dinamo Minsk players
FC Shakhtyor Soligorsk players
FC Ural Yekaterinburg players
FC Smorgon players
FC Sokol Saratov players
FC Starye Dorogi players
FC Dinamo-Juni Minsk players
FC Salyut Belgorod players
Belarusian expatriate footballers
Expatriate footballers in Russia
Association football defenders
Belarusian football managers
FC Dynamo Brest managers